Sarangapani was a composer of Carnatic music who lived during the 17th century in the village of Karvetinagaram in Andhra Pradesh. He is famous for his composition of Padams, a type of Carnatic song sung during Bharatanatyam performances. Sarangapani was the Minister of Education in the court of the local king Venkata Perumal.

Sarangapani was fluent in both Telugu and Sanskrit and wrote almost 200 Padams in both languages. His songs were written in tribute to the god Venugoplala, the presiding deity of Venugopalaswamy Temple, Karvetinagaram and contain the mudra "Venugopala".

Compositions

See also
 Venugopalaswamy Temple, Karvetinagaram

References

 M. V. Ramana, Pre-trinity composers of Tamil Nadu - Carnatica.net
 Carnatica.net

Carnatic composers
People from Rayalaseema
People from Chittoor district
Hindu poets
Telugu poets
History of Andhra Pradesh
Bhakti movement
Indian male classical musicians
Indian male composers
Musicians from Andhra Pradesh
Poets from Andhra Pradesh
Indian male poets
Kirtan performers